Tong Ching Man (唐清雯; 1 October 1970 - 21 April 1995) was a Hong Kong national executed in Singapore for drug trafficking

Biography
Born in Hong Kong in 1970, Tong Ching Man was working as a waitress at the time of her arrest.

Arrest at Changi Airport
On 15 December 1988, Tong and her boyfriend Lam Cheuk Wang (林灼宏) flew into Singapore from Hong Kong at 8:30pm and were due to catch a connecting Singapore Airlines flight to Brussels at 10pm that evening. They both wore large puffy jackets on top of their clothes, partly to protect against the cold winter weather of their final destination but mainly to disguise how bulky their torsos looked.

At 9:15pm, narcotics officers decided to mount a surprise check of the passengers boarding the flight to Brussels, and started searching people at random at the boarding gate. Lam's restless behavior caught the attention of the officials and he was then frisked. Lam was found to have 24 bags containing a total of 2.5 kg of a powder like substance, later determined to be heroin, strapped to his body in a nylon vest.  A one meter long blue rubber cloth had been wound round his torso and fastened with velcro in an effort to flatten the vest.

Knowing from previous experience that drug couriers often worked in pairs, the officers decided to conduct a thorough search of all the other passengers queuing for the flight.  Tong was searched about 25 minutes later, and she was found to have 18 bags containing a total of 2.3 kg of heroin strapped to her torso in a similar manner.

On 15 December 1988, Tong and Lam were charged with trafficking a total of 4.8 kg of heroin, worth an estimated $5 million, in Singapore.

Trial
On 12 August 1993, the Deputy Public Prosecutor Palaniappan Sundararaj outlined how Tong had 1.67 kg and Lam had 1.46 kg of pure heroin respectively when they were searched by officials at Changi Airport. Lam's defence was he was asked to carry blocks of tranquillizers to Belgium in order to avoid paying custom duties, and would be paid a fee of HK$15,000 for doing so. He did not realize the flight had a stop over in Singapore, therefore there was no intent to actually import it. Despite Lam testifying that he first met her at Kai Tak airport just before they flew out, Tong stated that he was in fact her boyfriend, and in October 1988 he invited her to go on holiday with him to Belgium. At the airport in Hong Kong, he gave her a vest to put on, telling her the contents were not dangerous and they were only trying to evade taxes and import duties.

Verdict
On 19 August 1993, Tong and Lam were both found guilty as charged and sentenced to death for importing 3 kilograms of heroin into Singapore, contrary to Section 7 of the Misuse of Drugs Act. Justice T.S. Sinnathuray rejected their defence that they did not know they were carrying heroin at the time of their arrest.

Appeal
On 16 May 1994, the Appeals court dismissed Tong and Lam's appeal against their convictions.

Execution
Tong Ching Man and Lam Cheuk Wang were both hanged at Changi Prison on the morning of 21 April 1995. Another three drug convicts, including another Hong Kong citizen Poon Yuen Chung, were also put to death on the same day itself.

See also 
 Capital punishment for drug trafficking
 Capital punishment in Singapore

References 

20th-century executions by Singapore
1970 births
1988 crimes in Singapore
1995 deaths
Hong Kong criminals
Hong Kong drug traffickers
Executed Hong Kong people
People executed for drug offences
Hong Kong people
People executed by hanging